"Cambia el Paso" is a song by American singer Jennifer Lopez and Puerto Rican singer Rauw Alejandro. It was co-written by the duo alongside Reggi el Auténtico, Georgia Ku, Andrés Castro, Jonas Jurström, Victor Thell, Mr. Naisgai and Caleb Calloway. "Cambia el Paso" was released on July 5, 2021, by Nuyorican Productions and Sony Music Latin.

Background and release 
"Cambia el Paso" was recorded after Lopez's split from ex-fiancé Alex Rodriguez. Prior to the song's recording, Alejandro asked Lopez to collaborate with him on another song of his titled "Tu La Tienes", which she agreed to. The pair subsequently met for the first time, with Lopez recalling: "I said, 'Let me play you some things I’ve been working on.' He heard 'Cambia el Paso', and he was like, 'Well, I can do that one too. Why can’t I get on that one?'" Alejandro then recorded his parts for "Cambia el Paso" on the spot.

On June 25, 2021, Alejandro revealed in an interview that he recorded two songs with Lopez; one for his project and one for hers. Over the next few days, Lopez posted a series of 12-second snippets of "Cambia el Paso" on her Instagram account, leading up to the June 29 announcement that the single would be released on July 5. According to the singer, the song is about "change" and "not being afraid to take the step". The song discusses "a woman who leaves an undeserving man". The song's lyrics, when translated into English, contain statements such as "He doesn't deserve to have her in his arms" and "Your life is better now without him."

Music video 
The music video for "Cambia el Paso" was directed by Jessy Terrero and shot in Miami Beach from June 8 – 9, 2021. Shortly after they finished filming, Lopez posted a photo from the shoot on Instagram with the caption: "There's only one... Good things coming...", with the hashtag #CambiaElPaso. She briefly teased the music video on her Instagram on July 2, before posting a 15-second sneak peak two days later. The music video premiered on July 9. The music video "opens on Lopez breaking free from a contentious situation, before she discovers joy dancing in the streets and on a beach."

Live performances 
Lopez performed the song live for the first time during the Global Citizen Live concert in New York City on September 26, 2021.

Critical reception 
Cambia el Paso received positive response. Emily Zemler of Rolling Stone calls the song "a fiery song; with a slick beat and Reggaeton grooves." Quinci Legardye of Harpers Bazaar said the song "has empowering lyrics about moving on and not being afraid of change." Zoe Haylock of Vulture called the song "a beat-thumping Spanish-language track."

Credits and personnel 

 Andrés Castro – songwriter
 Georgia Ku – songwriter
 Héctor Caleb López p/k/a Caleb Calloway – songwriter
 Jennifer Lopez – songwriter, vocals
 Jonas Jurström – songwriter, producer
 Luis Jonuel González p/k/a Mr. Naisgai – songwriter
 Rafael Regginalds Aponte a/k/a Reggi el Auténtico – songwriter
 Raúl Alejandro Ocasio Ruiz "Rauw Alejandro" – songwriter, vocals
 Victor Thell – songwriter, producer
 Micheline Medina – coordinator
 Chris Athens – master engineer
 Trevor Muzzy – mixing engineer, recording engineer
 Brandon Riester - A&R

Charts

References 

2021 singles
2021 songs
Jennifer Lopez songs
Rauw Alejandro songs
Nuyorican Productions singles
Sony Music Latin singles
Songs written by Jennifer Lopez
Songs written by Georgia Ku
Songs written by Rauw Alejandro
Music videos directed by Jessy Terrero